is a video game character from Square Enix's Final Fantasy series. Designed by Tetsuya Nomura, she was first introduced in the 1997 role-playing video game Final Fantasy VII as a young female ninja princess and thief. She can become one of the game's player characters after finishing a special sidequest. Yuffie reappears in the Compilation of Final Fantasy VII series, expanding her background and showing her after the events of the original game. Yuffie has further been featured in other Square Enix games, most notably the Kingdom Hearts crossover series, voiced by Yumi Kakazu in the Japanese versions of the games. In the English versions, Christy Carlson Romano provides her voice for Kingdom Hearts and Final Fantasy VII: Advent Children, and Mae Whitman is Yuffie's voice for Kingdom Hearts II, Dirge of Cerberus: Final Fantasy VII and Kingdom Hearts III Re Mind; she is voiced by Suzie Yeung in Final Fantasy VII Remake Intergrade. The character has achieved a high level of popularity in Japan, but the English-language media reception has been more mixed.

Appearances

Final Fantasy VII
One of two secret characters in the 1997 role-playing video game Final Fantasy VII, Yuffie is a 16-year-old ninja and a thief who fights with oversized shuriken that she can throw like a boomerang. After losing the war against Shinra Electric Power Company, Godo began to turn Wutai into a tourist attraction. This did not suit Yuffie, who began running off, stealing the magical Materia from unaware travelers in hope to someday become strong enough to change this situation. Sneaky and arrogant, Yuffie has a tomboyish and charismatic personality and obsessively steals and collects Materia. She also tends to be short-tempered and is prone to motion sickness. Gameplay-wise, Yuffie possesses the special Materia "Throw", enabling her to throw almost any item from the player's inventory at enemies during combat, and when leveled up, the ability "Coin" becomes available, allowing her to throw the party's Gil currency at the enemy.

Yuffie is introduced when she ambushes the protagonist Cloud Strife and his allies in either the Gongaga jungle or the forests south of Junon, appearing as "Mystery Ninja". If the player defeats her in combat and then chooses the correct series of dialogue choices, she introduces herself and joins the player's party as one of player characters. However, once in Wutai Village, Yuffie steals the party's Materia and hides, but is kidnapped by a Midgar crime lord, the lecherous Don Corneo. When the group rescues Yuffie, she returns the stolen Materia and continues working with the party. In another sidequest, she proves herself by fighting the bosses of Wutai's five-story pagoda, the last of these battles against Godo. These fights, and the sequence of conversations following, enable both father and daughter to understand the other's actions and to come to a mutual respect. At Godo's request, Cloud officially takes Yuffie (who obtains her level 4 Limit Break special attack, called "All Creation") with him on his quest.

If Yuffie is present at the end of disc one when Aerith Gainsborough is murdered by the party's nemesis Sephiroth, the player can witness an uncharacteristic display of emotion from the character, as she breaks down in Cloud's arms after failing to control her sobs. Yuffie's loyalty to the team is called into question after Cloud temporarily disbands his party ahead of their final confrontation with Sephiroth; when Yuffie is the last to return Barret Wallace suspects her of abandoning the team in light of her earlier treachery at Wutai. When Yuffie returns to the group she subsequently rebukes Barrett for his judgement.

Compilation of Final Fantasy VII

In the 2005 computer animated film Final Fantasy VII: Advent Children, Yuffie reunites with her Final Fantasy VII allies to fight against the summon creature Bahamut SIN. In the On the Way to a Smile novella "Case of Yuffie", which is set between the end of Final Fantasy VII and the beginning of Advent Children, the disease Geostigma spreads to Wutai, and Yuffie sets out to find a cure.

In the 2004 action role-playing game Before Crisis: Final Fantasy VII, set six years before Final Fantasy VII, Yuffie encounters Shinra's agents called the Turks in Wutai and unknowingly works with them against the eco-terrorist group AVALANCHE. In the 2006 third-person shooter game Dirge of Cerberus: Final Fantasy VII, set one year after Advent Children, Yuffie leaves home and joins the World Regenesis Organization, where she is placed in charge of espionage and intelligence gathering. Yuffie infiltrates Mako Reactor Zero deep within the ruins of Midgar and shuts it off when the ex-Turk Vincent Valentine defeats the Shinra remnant Deepground.

The nine-year-old Yuffie makes brief appearances in the 2007 prequel action role-playing game Crisis Core: Final Fantasy VII, where she fights against Shinra following their invasion and takeover of Wutai. After meeting Zack Fair, she enlists his help to find treasures in several side missions.

Other appearances
Outside the Final Fantasy series, Yuffie has also been featured in the Kingdom Hearts series since 2002. In the first Kingdom Hearts, a younger Yuffie acts as a supporting character in Traverse Town, helping to defeat the Heartless who had destroyed her world. Yuffie's appearance in 2004's Kingdom Hearts: Chain of Memories is a projection from Sora's memories in Traverse Town. In 2005's Kingdom Hearts II, she aids Leon and the others as part of the Hollow Bastion Restoration Committee, this time appearing in her Advent Children attire. In both Kingdom Hearts and Kingdom Hearts II, Yuffie is additionally featured as an opponent in the Olympus Coliseum, while 2008's Kingdom Hearts coded features a virtual simulation of Yuffie. She also appears in the manga adaptations of Kingdom Hearts, Kingdom Hearts II and Chain of Memories published by Gangan Comics and Tokyopop. Yuffie also appeared in the DLC expansion "Re:Mind" for Kingdom Hearts III.

Yuffie is an unlockable playable character in the PlayStation version of the 1998 fighting game Ehrgeiz: God Bless the Ring, appearing alongside other characters from Final Fantasy VII. She is also one of the playable characters in the 2006 board video game Itadaki Street Portable for the PlayStation Portable, in a chibi-style design that is similar to her model during the exploration gameplay mode of Final Fantasy VII, and in the 2013 action puzzle mobile game Pictlogica Final Fantasy, also in a chibi form. She was the first DLC character released for the 2014 rhythm game Theatrhythm Final Fantasy: Curtain Call, returning in 2016's arcade game follow-up TFF: All-Star Carnival. Yuffie is also appearing as a playable character in the free-to-play role-playing video games Final Fantasy Record Keeper (2014) and Dissidia Final Fantasy Opera Omnia (2017).

Yuffie also makes unplayable appearances in some video games. In the 2008 action role-playing / fighting game hybrid Dissidia Final Fantasy, she is a tutor of the in-game manuals and an unlockable friend card in this game. Yuffie is a "Legend" type assist character in the 2012 social role-playing mobile game Final Fantasy Airborne Brigade, depicted in her Final Fantasy VII, Advent Children and Kingdom Hearts outfits. She appears as one of three summonable support characters in the 2014 racing mobile game Final Fantasy VII G-Bike and is featured in the card video games Final Fantasy Trading Card Game (2011) and Final Fantasy Artniks (2012).

Two large Yuffie action figures were released by Square Enix as part of the Final Fantasy VII Play Arts Vol. 2 series in 2008 (in her original game attire), and Final Fantasy VII Movie Advent Children Series 2 in 2009 (in her film attire). Other merchandise include a small super deformed figurine version as she appears in Itadaki Street Portable, from 2009's Final Fantasy Trading Arts Mini Vol. 4, a 1997 plush doll and a keyholder figurine by Banpresto, a 2001 garage kit figure by Kotobukiya, and a wallscroll poster in Final Fantasy Poster Vol. 5. Her theme music in Final Fantasy VII, "Descendant of Shinobi", is included in a vocal form on the album Final Fantasy Song Book: Mahoroba as "Walking in the Road, After the Rain" by Nobuo Uematsu and Yuji Hasegawa. Yuffie appears in Super Smash Bros. Ultimate as a spirit. Yuffie was added to Final Fantasy VII Remake Intergrade.

Creation and development
During the early development of Final Fantasy VII, Yuffie was envisioned as a 25-year-old ex-SOLDIER now working as a bounty hunter, seeking both the game's protagonist Cloud Strife and its antagonist Sephiroth, while to have a bounty on her own head. Her job class was originally listed as "ninja (assassin)" and she was intended to be a daughter of the long-deceased Kasumi Kisaragi. The Wutai sidequest present in the final incarnation of the game was significantly different. Her age and description was different for each of the several wanted posters; what Yuffie looks like, as her level, is determined on the last wanted poster viewed. She would encounter the party in a random encounter, or attack Cloud when he is sleeping in an inn. The Wutai scenario required Yuffie to be recruited to complete it.

Having a close attachment to Yuffie's character, Final Fantasy VII event planner Jun Akiyama was responsible for a large number of cutscenes featuring her and her actions during fights. Regarding the use of Japanese pronouns, Yuffie uses atashi "as opposed to the other female characters who use watashi, perhaps to make her sound more cute or youthful, as she is younger than the others". Mae Whitman, who voiced Yuffie in the English versions of Kingdom Hearts II and Dirge of Cerberus, said she was not "aware of the extent to which people were familiar with her character already". In a 2012 interview, Whitman recalled Yuffie as "bubbly and bright and nice. But still super cool!" Yuffie's design in Kingdom Hearts was partially based on the originally planned appearance of Rikku from Final Fantasy X.  During the interview of the developers Naoki Hamaguchi and Motomu Toriyama on Yuffie's Moogle hood and role at Final Fantasy VII Remake Intergrade, Toriyama said that Yuffie wears Moogle hood, because it draws its reference from the time it was used in Dirge of Cerberus: Final Fantasy VII, and Yuffie wears it whenever she is on a covert mission, while her role is the same as in the original game.

Reception

Yuffie Kisaragi has received a notably positive reception in Japan, having placed as the 42nd best PlayStation character in the 2007 "Den-Play Awards" by Dengeki PlayStation. In 2010, readers of Japanese magazine Famitsu voted her as the 48th best video game character of all time. In a 2013 poll by Square Enix, Yuffie was voted the 14th most popular Final Fantasy female character, sharing that spot with Beatrix from Final Fantasy IX.

Electronic Gaming Monthly (EGM) included "seeing Yuffie once again" as one of the greatest moments of Kingdom Hearts while giving it their Role-Playing Game of the Year 2002 award. David Smith from IGN ranked Yuffie seventh on the 2008 list of top ten Final Fantasy VII characters, stating that she "belongs in the Wacky Sidekicks wing of the RPG hall of fame"; although commenting that Yuffie can sometimes be "a pain in the neck", Smith said that she became such an appealing sidekick character that Square would go on to use the "Yuffie formula" with Rikku for Final Fantasy X.

Final Fantasy VII director Yoshinori Kitase asked EGM "why American gamers love Yuffie so much". They were unable to come with a clear answer. According to Edge, Yuffie, being one of characters that are "brands in and of themselves", created a new anime stereotype, as giddy girl ninja. WomanGamers.com gave the character an overall score of 7.0/10, opining that while "a 16 year old ninja girl was a nice refreshing change [...] it would have been nice if her character had matured and developed through this story". In 2012, Becky Cunningham of Cheat Code Central ranked her as the fourth top ninja in video games, stating that despite her "cocky, brash, and slightly abrasive personality", Yuffie is "also a compassionate person with an impressive goal", serving "as a unlikely hero, a seemingly self-centered sneak thief who always does the right thing in the end". In a 2014 poll by Spanish magazine Hobby Consolas, Yuffie was voted one of eight best ninja characters in video games. Márcio Pacheco Alexsandro of Brazil's Game Hall placed Yuffie at the fifth spot on his 2014 list of top female ninja characters in games, commenting on her close resemblance to Makimachi Misao from Rurouni Kenshin. In 2012, Jef Rouner of the Houston Press listed Yuffie's reaction to Aerith's death as one of the five most "heartbreaking" missable scenes in the Final Fantasy franchise, which he felt rivaled the emotional impact of anything found in the main narrative.

UGO.com featured her in the 2011 list of 25 most sexy ninja girls in all media for her appearance in Advent Children, adding "that third-dimension certainly adds something". In his review for Advent Children, James Mielke of 1UP.com called her "as cutely jailbait as ever"; the film itself was called "Ogling Legal-Age Yuffie" by Geson Hatchett of Hardcore Gamer. In 2015, Indonesian television Liputan 6 ranked her seventh in their list of the sexiest Oriental characters in gaming.

However, some of the reception was more negative. In her character profile, IGN called her "both impressively useful and incredibly annoying". GameFan editor The 6th Man compared himself to Yuffie, as "in one word—annoying" but also having "that innocent, naive qualify". In 2010, Scott Sharkey of 1UP.com placed her in the category "The Perky Idiot" alongside Rikku and Selphie while discussing the top five character types in the Final Fantasy series. That same year, GamesRadars Mikel Reparaz included the appearance of Yuffie among the other Final Fantasy VII characters in Ehrgeiz on the list of the 55 best character cameos in video game history, but called her "hyper-annoying". In 2013, Kyle Lowe of Complex ranked her as the fifth most annoying classic video game character. Joe Juba of Game Informer included her among "Final Fantasys particular breed of annoying companions, like Selphie and Vaan". Lisa Foiles of The Escapist included this "crazy, hyperactive teenager" on her 2014 list of top five annoying princesses in video games, calling her "just a definition of annoying". As a result of calling her an unimportant character in Final Fantasy VII due to how difficult is to get her, Paste Magazine regarded Yuffie's portrayal in the remake as far more entertaining take on Yuffie due to her role in the narrative.

See also
 List of Final Fantasy VII characters
 Ninja in popular culture

References

External links

 Yuffie Kisaragi at the Final Fantasy Wiki

Characters designed by Tetsuya Nomura
Female characters in video games
Fictional blade and dart throwers
Fictional female ninja
Fictional hunters in video games
Fictional professional thieves
Final Fantasy VII characters
Ninja characters in video games
Princess characters in video games
Science fantasy video game characters
Square Enix protagonists
Teenage characters in video games
Video game characters introduced in 1997
Woman soldier and warrior characters in video games
ja:ファイナルファンタジーVIIの登場人物#ユフィ・キサラギ